Reaching to the Converted is an album by Billy Bragg released in August 1999. It is a collection of B-sides and rarities that spans Billy's entire career. It includes variations on old favorites, such as "Greetings to the New Brunette" (retitled "Shirley") and "Walk Away Renee". None of the tracks on the album were reissued as extras for Bragg's box sets, Volume 1 and Volume 2.

The original album cover has the subtitle "(Minding The Gaps)".

Track listing
All tracks composed by Billy Bragg; except where indicated
 "Shirley" 
 "Sulk" (words: Billy Bragg; music: Billy Bragg, Cara Tivey)
 "Accident Waiting to Happen" (Red Star Version) 
 "The Boy Done Good" (words: Billy Bragg; music: Johnny Marr)
 "Heart Like a Wheel" (Anna McGarrigle)
 "Bad Penny" 
 "Ontario, Quebec and Me" 
 "Walk Away Renée" (Version) (music: Mike Lookofsky, Tony Sansone, Bob Calilli; monologue: Billy Bragg)
 "Rule Nor Reason"
 "Days Like These" (UK Version) 
 "Think Again" (Dick Gaughan)
 "Scholarship Is the Enemy of Romance" 
 "Wishing the Days Away" (Ballad Version)
 "The Tatler" (Ry Cooder, Russ Titelman)
 "Jeane" (Steven Morrissey, Johnny Marr)
 "She's Leaving Home" (John Lennon, Paul McCartney)
 "I Don't Need This Pressure Ron"

Song details 
"Shirley" - Previously unreleased version of "Greetings to the New Brunette", recorded in 1992.
Billy Bragg - Vocals
Johnny Marr - Everything else
"Sulk" & "Accident Waiting to Happen" - B & A-side GO! Discs [U.K.] #67 (2/92).
Billy Bragg - vocals, guitar
Wiggy - lead guitar
Cara Tivey - vocals, keyboards
Nigel Frydman - bass
Rob Allum - drums
"The Boy Done Good" - A-side of Cooking Vinyl [U.K.] #064 (5/97)
Billy Bragg - vocals
Cara Tivey - keyboards
Jody Linscott - percussion
Lorrain Bowen - backing vocals
Johnny Marr - everything else
"Heart Like a Wheel" - B-side of "You Woke Up My Neighbourhood" GO! Discs [U.K.] #60 (8/91)
Billy Bragg - vocals
Cara Tivey - vocals, keyboards
"Bad Penny" - B-side of "Sexuality" GO! Discs [U.K.] #56 (6/91)
Billy Bragg - vocals, guitar
Wiggy - Guitar
Amanda Vincent - piano
Andy Hobson - bass
JFT Hood - drums
Kirsty MacColl - backing vocals
"Ontario, Quebec and Me" - B-side of "You Woke Up My Neighbourhood" GO! Discs [U.K.] #60 (8/91)
Billy Bragg - vocals, guitar
"Walk Away Renee" - B-side of "Levi Stubbs' Tears" GO! Discs [U.K.] #12  (6/86)
Billy Bragg - monologue
Johnny Marr - acoustic guitar
"Rule Nor Reason" - B-Side of "Upfield" Cooking Vinyl [U.K.] #051 (9/96)
Billy Bragg - vocals, guitar
Cara Tivey - harmonium
"Days Like These" (UK Version) - A-side GO! Discs [U.K.] #8 (12/85)
Billy Bragg - vocals, guitar
"Think Again"  - B-side of "Levi Stubbs' Tears" GO! Discs [U.K.] #12  (6/86)
Billy Bragg - vocals, acoustic & electric guitars
Kenny Jones - guitar
John Porter - mandolin
"Scholarship Is the Enemy of Romance" - B-side of "Days Like These" GO! Discs [U.K.] #8 (12/85)
Billy Bragg - guitar, vocals
"Wishing the Days Away" (Ballad Version) - B-side of "Waiting for the Great Leap Forwards" GO! Discs [U.K.] #23 (8/88)
Billy Bragg - vocals
Cara Tivey - keyboards
"The Tatler" & "Jeane" - B-side of "Greetings to the New Brunette" GO! Discs [U.K.] #15 (11/86)
Billy Bragg - vocals, guitar
"She's Leaving Home" - A-side of ChildLine [U.K.] #1 (5/88)
Billy Bragg - vocals
Cara Tivey - vocals, piano, recorders
"I Don't Need This Pressure Ron" - B-side of "Days Like These" GO! Discs [U.K.] #8 (12/85)
Billy Bragg - vocals
Robert Handley - vocals

References
All information is from album liner notes unless otherwise noted.

B-side compilation albums
Billy Bragg compilation albums
1999 compilation albums
Albums produced by Grant Showbiz
Albums produced by John Porter (musician)
Cooking Vinyl compilation albums